Resolutes may refer to:
Elizabeth Resolutes, an early baseball team in New Jersey
Cincinnati Resolutes, predecessor of the Cincinnati Reds baseball team (History of the Cincinnati Reds)
Boston Resolutes, a Negro Baseball League team